is a Japanese TV personality, actress, writer and former adult video (AV) performer who retired from the AV industry in 2008.

Life and career
Honoka was born in Kagoshima Prefecture, Japan. She is a licensed practical nurse and has appeared as a race queen at the 2004 Suzuka 8 Hours endurance race (July 2004). She plays the guitar, enjoys swimming and volleyball, going to Kabuki theatre and walking her dog. Like fellow AV Idols Sora Aoi and Nana Natsume, she has been able to combine a career as an AV actress with mainstream movie and TV appearances.

Before she started in AV, Honoka had a small role as a Gynoid secretary in the TV Tokyo cosplay drama The Ultimate Venus Angel Healing Force (究極癒し戦隊ヴィーナスエンジェル) which she was in from February 16 to March 29, 2004.

AV actress
Honoka began her adult video career in June 2004 with Bud for the Try-Heart Corporation on their Sexia label. She made several more videos with Try-Heart over the next 18 months and in March 2006, she starred in videos for two new AV studios, Sell Debut x Risky Mosaic, directed by Hideto Aki, at S1 No. 1 Style and Deep Impact - Honoka Sell Debut for the Premium Glamour label. She continued working with the two studios usually appearing in one video every other month for each studio. Her last original work with S1 was released in January 2008, but she continued to make films with Premium until her retirement. Both S1 and Premium are affiliated with Japan's largest producer of adult videos, the Hokuto Corporation.

During Honoka's AV career, she worked for studios which specialized in softer, more glamour-oriented types of pornography, and she was one of the most popular AV actress in Japan. In the DMM listing of the top 100 actresses by sales, she placed No. 2 in 2006 and No. 3 in 2007. She also won the Nice Body award from Video Boy magazine twice, in 2005 and in 2006.

Honoka was part of the S1 compilation video Hyper – Barely There Mosaic (ハイパーギリギリモザイク) with AV idols Sora Aoi, Yua Aida, Yuma Asami, Maria Ozawa and Rin Aoki which won the 2006 AV Open competition among Japanese porn studios. She was also the recipient of the "Best Actress" prize at the 2007 Adult Broadcasting Awards for the 2006 broadcast year. After pressing her tongue against the phallus-shaped prize statuette, she declared "I never thought I would be selected. I'd like to say that it was 'my pleasure' to my fans." In closing, she added "I want to be more famous in the AV field" and "I also want to encourage other girls to strive to be the best. Honoka was again honored by fans by winning the Best Actress award in the 2006 AV Actress Grand Prix. Another of her S1 videos, Hyper Risky Mosaic - Special Bath House Tsubaki (ハイパーギリギリモザイク 特殊浴場 TSUBAKI 貸切入浴料1億円), with 11 other S1 actresses was the First Place winning entry in the 2007 AV Open contest.

Honoka announced in her Official Blog that she was retiring in December 2008 and that her December 7, 2008 video for Premium, Pleasures of Education, would be her last. She participated in one final event for Premium by making a round of publicity appearances at Tokyo shops on December 20, 2008. She also acted as co-host with mainstream actor Nagare Hagiwara for the 2009 AV Grand Prix ceremony. She has continued to keep her blog open.

In 2012, the major Japanese adult video distributor DMM held a poll of its customers to choose the 100 all time best AV actresses to celebrate the 30th anniversary of adult videos in Japan. Honoka finished in 37th place in the balloting.

TV appearances
Honoka was in the J-dorama Shimokita GLORY DAYS (下北GLORY DAYS) along with fellow S1 actresses Sora Aoi and Yuma Asami and singer-actress Aya Sugimoto. The 12-week series aired on TV Tokyo beginning in April 2006. She played the character Nishina Natsume in the series which is based on the manga of the same name and revolves about a ronin student moving to Tokyo and sharing a house with several beautiful women. She was also in the TV romantic comedy Cupid no Itazura (クピドの悪戯) on TV Tokyo which ran for 11 weeks beginning October 13, 2006 and concerned a young man with the rare disease of "rainbow balls" which limits the number of times he can have sex in his life. In addition, Honoka played the character of Keiko in the third episode ("OL Manager") of the Fuji TV drama Unusual Story Fall '06 Special Edition (世にも奇妙な物語 '06秋の特別編)  on October 2, 2006. In late 2009, she made a guest appearance in the first season of the television series The Ancient Dogoo Girl, a comic tokusatsu show directed by Noboru Iguchi. 
She has also appeared as a guest on a number of TV variety shows.

In the tokusatsu Super Sentai parody Unofficial Sentai Akibaranger, she played the role of the chief villain Malseena in the BS Asahi TV series which ran from April 6, 2012 to June 29, 2012.  A 2nd season was announced in January 2013, and debuted April 5, 2013 with Honoka returning as Malseena.

Film appearances
In addition to several softcore V-Cinema videos, Honoka has also been featured in mainstream movies. She starred in award-winning director Toru Kamei's film  based on the manga of the same name by Naoki Yamamoto. The film was first released June 9, 2007 at a late show at the Pole Pole cinema in Higashi-Nakano and later (July 25, 2007) as a DVD. She also had a major role in Noboru Iguchi's over-the-top action-horror gorefest The Machine Girl which premiered at the Yubari International Fantastic Film Festival on March 22, 2008 and was released as a DVD on June 3, 2008.

Honoka also had a role in the June 2008 theatrical drama  directed by Hideyuki Katsuki. The film, fifth in the Dekotora no shu series, starred Show Aikawa and also featured pink film actress Junko Miyashita and AV actress Maria Yumeno. Honoka continued her mainstream film career in 2009 by starring in the Tōru Kamei directed drama  which premiered at the Tsutaya theatre in Shibuya, Tokyo on December 15, 2009 and was released as a DVD on January 22, 2010 by AMG.

In 2012, she starred in director Junpei Matsumoto's debut film, a drama of disaffected youth in Tokyo, which reached theaters in May 2012. In his review of the film, critic Mark Schilling calls her acting surprising for a former AV actress, characterizing her performance as "committed, if slightly awkward." In October 2012 she played the part of Eleena in the action movie , commemorating the thirtieth anniversary of the Space Sheriff Gavan TV series. In 2013, she was cast as Sakura in the manga-based thrillers Tokyo Yamimushi Parts I and II, directed by Sakichi Sato. Both films were released on September 28, 2013.

Literary activities
Honoka authored two books in 2009, Little Sex Devil, on sex and sexuality for publisher Best Sellers, in January 2009, and Pleasures of the Body, Shape of Love, five short stories about "men and women" published by Futabasha in July 2009.

On January 18, 2010, she released an autobiographical work, Kago Biography of Honoka: Mama, I Love You. The book, published by Shufunotomo, gives an account of her childhood which involved kidnappers, and sexual and physical abuse. She says she was tricked into her AV debut, thinking she was going to make a CD. Honoka's book is one of a number of memoirs by actresses about the AV industry harking back to Ai Iijima's semi-autobiographical novel Platonic Sex in 2000, and including Mihiro's partially fictionalized autobiography nude from 2009 and Saori Hara's My Real Name Is Mai Kato: Why I Became an AV Actress from December 2009, which adult media reporter Rio Yasuda sees as marking a trend in which the AV industry is being assimilated into popular culture.

Bibliography 
 Little Sex Devil() (January 2009)
 Pleasures of the Body, Shape of Love() (July 2009)
 Kago Biography of Honoka: Mama, I Love You (January 18, 2010)

Filmography

Adult videos (AV)

Theatrical films
  (June 2007)
 The Machine Girl (March 2008)
  (June 2008)
  (December 2009)
 Helldriver (September 2010)
  (February 2012)
  (May 2012)
  (October 2012)
  (June 2013)
  (September 2013)
  (September 2013)
  (October 2014)

Notes

Sources

External links 
 
 

Japanese television personalities
Japanese pornographic film actresses
Japanese women writers
Living people
Year of birth missing (living people)